Yuan Cha (died June 525), courtesy name Bojun (伯雋), nickname Yecha (夜叉), was an official of the Xianbei-led Northern Wei dynasty of China, who initially came to power as the brother-in-law of Emperor Xiaoming's mother and regent Empress Dowager Hu.  In 520, after a conflict with her lover Yuan Yi (元懌) the Prince of Qinghe, he killed Yuan Yi and put Empress Dowager Hu under house arrest, effectively taking over as regent.  In 525, a countercoup by Empress Dowager Hu restored her, and bowing to public pressure, she forced him to commit suicide.

Background
Yuan Cha was the oldest son of Yuan Ji (元繼) the Prince of Jiangyang, who was a distant member of the imperial clan, whose ancestor was a son of Northern Wei's founder Emperor Daowu. He served as a low level official in Emperor Xuanwu's administration.

Rise to power
After Emperor Xuanwu's death in 515 and succession by his young son Emperor Xiaoming, Emperor Xiaoming's mother Empress Dowager Hu, who was Emperor Xuanwu's concubine, became regent.  Yuan Cha had married Empress Dowager Hu's sister, whom she created the Lady of Fengyi and saw often.  Because of this relationship, Yuan Cha became trusted by her and was continuously promoted.  As a result, Yuan Cha became corrupt and arrogant.

Empress Dowager Hu forced Emperor Xuanwu's brother Yuan Yi the Prince of Qinghe, who was popular among the people and the officials for his humility and abilities, to have an affair with her, and Yuan Yi, by 520, was effectively the leader of the administration.  He often curbed the abuses of power that both Yuan Cha and the eunuch Liu Teng (劉騰), who became powerful because he had once saved Empress Dowager Hu's life.  Yuan Cha therefore had one of his associates, Song Wei (宋維), falsely accuse Yuan Yi of treason, and Empress Dowager Hu, for some time, put Yuan Yi under house arrest while she investigated, but eventually Yuan Yi was cleared.  Yuan Cha, fearful of retaliation by Yuan Yi, conspired with Liu Teng, and after convincing the 10-year-old Emperor Xiaoming that Yuan Yi was in fact plotting treason, took Emperor Xiaoming into their custody and then carried out a coup against Yuan Yi and Empress Dowager Hu, executing Yuan Yi and putting Empress Dowager Hu under house arrest.  Yuan Cha made Emperor Xiaoming's granduncle Yuan Yong the Prince of Gaoyang the titular head of government, but in effect, Yuan Cha, in association with Liu, was the actual regent.

Regency
Yuan Cha was not particularly able as a regent, and he and Liu multiplied their corruption once they were in power.  Yuan Cha himself was not dedicated at all to the affairs of state, but spent much of his time on feasting, drinking, and women.  He put his father Yuan Ji and his brothers into positions of power, and they were just as corrupt.  Yuan Cha's incompetence and corruption, together with the level of corruption that Empress Dowager Hu herself tolerated while in power, led to popular dissatisfaction with the regime and many agrarian revolts, although the first revolt was by a non-agrarian—Yuan Xi (元熙) the Prince of Zhongshan, who was friendly with both Empress Dowager Hu and Yuan Yi—in fall 520, trying to avenge Yuan Yi and restore Empress Dowager Hu.  Yuan Cha quickly had Yuan Xi's rebellion suppressed.

In late 520, Yuan Cha spent much of Northern Wei's energy on trying to restore Rouran's khan Yujiulü Anagui, who had been overthrown by his cousin Yujiulü Shifa (郁久閭示發), despite warnings that doing so would either be fruitless or counterproductive.  The restoration was successful, but by 523 Yujiulü Anagui had rebelled and was an enemy to Northern Wei again.

On 18 April 521, the general Xi Kangsheng (奚康生) made an attempt to restore Empress Dowager Hu, but failed. Yuan Cha had him put to death.

In 523, the official Li Chong (李崇) saw that the people of the six northern military garrisons, largely ethnic Xianbei, who had for generations been forced to stay at those garrisons to defend against Rouran attacks, were stirring with discontent, and he suggested to Yuan Cha and Emperor Xiaoming that the garrisons be converted into provinces and that the people be given the rights of the people of other provinces.  Yuan Cha refused.  Later that year, the people of Huaihuang (懷荒, in modern Zhangjiakou, Hebei) and Woye (沃野, in modern Bayan Nur, Inner Mongolia) Garrisons rebelled—rebellions that Northern Wei forces could not quickly quell, and the rebellions soon spread throughout not only the six garrisons but throughout virtually the entire empire.

Death
In 525, Yuan Faseng (元法僧), the governor of Xu Province (徐州, modern northern Jiangsu), who had been a close associate of Yuan Cha, believing that Yuan Cha would soon fall, rebelled as well, declaring himself emperor.  After some initial defeats at the hands of Northern Wei forces sent against him, he surrendered his post of Pengcheng (彭城, in modern Xuzhou, Jiangsu) to Northern Wei's southern rival Liang Dynasty.

By this point, Yuan Cha's precautions against Empress Dowager Hu had been greatly relaxed, particularly after Liu Teng's death in 523, as he no longer saw her as a threat.  Empress Dowager Hu, Emperor Xiaoming, and Yuan Yong therefore took the chance to conspire against Yuan Cha.  Empress Dowager Hu first threw Yuan Cha's guard off by often discussing about his overly trusting of Yuan Faseng, which caused Yuan Cha to be an apologetic mood.  Then, with his agreement, she relieved him of his command of the imperial guards, replacing him with his associate Hou Gang (侯剛).  In summer 525, she took sudden action and declared herself regent again, killing most of Yuan Cha's and Liu's associates and putting Yuan Cha under house arrest.  However, she was initially hesitant to take further action against Yuan Cha, because of her relationship with her sister. Eventually, however, he and his brother Yuan Zhua (元爪) were accused of treason, and popular opinion (including Emperor Xiaoming) favored their deaths. As such, Empress Dowager Hu agreed that the two should be forced to commit suicide, but still awarded Yuan Cha much posthumous honor.

References

525 deaths
Northern Wei regents
Year of birth unknown
Suicides in Northern Wei